Robin Book (born 5 April 1992) is a Swedish football midfielder who plays for Jönköpings Södra IF.

References

1992 births
Living people
Sportspeople from Helsingborg
Swedish footballers
Association football midfielders
Syrianska FC players
GAIS players
Utsiktens BK players
Varbergs BoIS players
Örebro SK players
Jönköpings Södra IF players
Ettan Fotboll players
Superettan players
Allsvenskan players